The year 1900 was the 119th year of the Rattanakosin Kingdom of Siam (now known as Thailand). It was the 33rd year in the reign of King Chulalongkorn (Rama V), and is reckoned as years 118 (1 January – 31 March) and 119 (1 April – 31 December) in the Rattanakosin Era.

Incumbents
 Monarch: Chulalongkorn (Rama V)
 Crown Prince: Vajiravudh
 Supreme Patriarch: Ariyavangsagatayana (Sa Pussadeva)

Events
 23 February – King Chulalongkorn gives the Phra Racha Wang Derm (or Thonburi Palace) to the Royal Siamese Navy, the Naval Academy later moved into the compound.
 25 May – King Chulalongkorn arrives in Kota Bharu and meets with Sultan Muhammad IV of Kelantan on board his royal yacht.
 21 December – The Bangkok to Khorat rail line was officially opened, with a branch line to Lopburi also under construction.

Births
11 May – Pridi Banomyong was born in Ayutthaya Province

Deaths

References

 
1900s in Siam
Years of the 20th century in Thailand
Siam
Siam